Inka Marka (meaning Force of the Incas) is an Australian band that plays Bolivian, Peruvian and Ecuadorian  music. Their album Auki Auki was nominated for 2000 ARIA Award for Best World Music Album.

Members
 Jose Diaz Rodriguez
 Michel Bestrin
 Raul Reinal
 Karen Ivanyi
 Limbert Angulo

Former members
 Orlando Arias 
 Enqrique Berbis 
 Henry Saavedra
 John Paul Pincheira
 Rodrigo Santelices
 Cristian Seguin 
 Jaime Carrasco
 Juan Paredes
 Andrew Mellado
 Jorge Cuiza
 John Kendall
 Nicholas Sajeropolous

Discography

Albums : These are the albums of Inka Marka Music of the Andes (based in Australia) 
NOT to be confused with the Peruvian Inka marka based in Cusco ( whoever did the last discography ) 

 Ripusani :  1996 Produced and distributed Inka Marka 
 Kusi Kuna : 1997 Produced and distributed Inka Marka 
 Entre Los Amigos :1997 Produced and distributed Mabuhay Records
 Auki Auki :1999 Produced by and distributed Market Music 
 Valle de la Luna : 2001 Produced and distributed Black Market Music
 Wirachocha : 2002 Produced and distributed Black Market Music
 Shaman : 2005 Produced and distributed Black Market Music
 Misa Criolla : 2004 Produced and distributed Black Market Music
 Quilla Tierra de Suenos : 2011 Produced and distributed Inka Marka 
 En Vivo : 2012 Produced and distributed Inka Marka 
 Mama Luna : 2012 Produced and distributed Inka Marka

Awards and nominations

ARIA Music Awards
The ARIA Music Awards is an annual awards ceremony that recognises excellence, innovation, and achievement across all genres of Australian music. They commenced in 1987.

! 
|-
| 2000
| Auki Auki
| ARIA Award for Best World Music Album
| 
| 
|-

References

External links
Inka Marka

Australian world music groups
Latin American music
Andean music